National New Media Industry Base, is a state-level cultural and technological development zone inside of Guanyinsi Subdistrict, Daxing District, Beijing, China. As of 2020, its census population was 9,827.

References 

Daxing District
Science and technology in the People's Republic of China